The 1944 United States Senate election in Missouri took place on November 7, 1944 in Missouri. The incumbent Democratic Senator, Bennett Champ Clark, was defeated in the primary by Roy McKittrick, who went on to lose the general election to Republican nominee Forrest C. Donnell. Donnell overperformed presidential candidate Thomas E. Dewey, who lost the state with 48.4% of the vote in the presidential election.

Democratic primary

Candidates
 Bennett Champ Clark, the incumbent Senator
 Roy McKittrick, Attorney General of Missouri

Results

Republican primary

Candidates
 Forrest C. Donnell, Governor of Missouri
 H. Grosby, physician
 Charles P. Noell, lawyer
 Charles E. Rendlen, lawyer
 Charles Shaw, former Mayor of Clayton, Missouri
 Howard V. Stephens, president of Johnson-Stephen and Shinkle Shoe Company and former member of the St. Louis Board of Police Commissioners
 William McKinley Thomas, International Shoe Company employee

Results

Other candidates
The Socialist Labor Party of America nominated state chairman William Wesley Cox for the election. Cox was the party's presidential candidate in 1920, winning 31,084 votes. The Socialist Party of America nominated D. B. Preisler.

Results

References

1944
Missouri
United States Senate